Hancock Bridge may refer to:
 Hancock Bridge (Delaware River)
 Hancock Bridge, Mumbai
 Hancock's Bridge, New Jersey